The Austin F. Williams Carriagehouse and House is a historic house at 127 Main Street in Farmington, Connecticut.  Built in the mid-19th century, the property was designated a National Historic Landmark for the role it played in the celebrated case of the Amistad Africans, and as a "station" on the Underground Railroad.

Description and history
Austin Williams (1805–1885) and his wife Jennet Cowles Williams were abolitionists. This property first became important in the Amistad case.  When the Mende men who had participated in the revolt on the slave ship La Amistad were released from prison in 1841, Williams purchased this property and erected a dormitory building in which the Mende men could stay while awaiting arrangements for their return to Africa.  Williams was friends with Lewis Tappan who was assisting the Africans.  The structure that was built is now part of the carriage house. The men did agricultural work during this period.  In 1842, the Williamses built their Greek Revival house.  The cellar of the carriage house served as a hiding place for escaping slaves as a part of the Underground Railroad.

The site was declared a National Historic Landmark in 1998.  It is located at 127 Main Street in Farmington and is part of the Farmington Historic District.  The house is a private residence and is not open to the public.

See also
List of National Historic Landmarks in Connecticut
National Register of Historic Places listings in Hartford County, Connecticut
List of Underground Railroad sites

References

External links
 Amistad: Seeking Freedom in Connecticut, a National Park Service Discover Our Shared Heritage Travel Itinerary
 Aboard the Underground Railroad: Austin F. Williams Carriagehouse and House, National Park Service

Houses in Farmington, Connecticut
National Historic Landmarks in Connecticut
Houses on the Underground Railroad
Abolitionism in the United States
Carriage houses in the United States
Houses on the National Register of Historic Places in Connecticut
Transportation buildings and structures on the National Register of Historic Places in Connecticut
Greek Revival houses in Connecticut
National Register of Historic Places in Hartford County, Connecticut
Carriage houses on the National Register of Historic Places
Individually listed contributing properties to historic districts on the National Register in Connecticut
Connecticut